Olivier Sorin (born 16 April 1981 in Gien) is a French footballer who last played as goalkeeper for Rennes in the French Ligue 1.

Nancy
Sorin started his professional career in AS Nancy and he made 70 appearances. He stayed there for seven years.

Auxerre
Sorin signed a contract with AJ Auxerre in 2007, and he played in 2010–2011 season's Champions League. He stayed there until the summer of 2014.

Rennes
In June 2014, Sorin signed a two-year contract with Stade Rennais F.C. He left the club in summer 2016 following the end of his contract.

References

External links

1981 births
People from Gien
Living people
French footballers
AJ Auxerre players
AS Nancy Lorraine players
Stade Rennais F.C. players
Ligue 1 players
Ligue 2 players
Association football goalkeepers
Sportspeople from Loiret
Footballers from Centre-Val de Loire